Il va pleuvoir sur Conakry  is a 2007 French film.

Synopsis 
BB works as a political cartoonist at a liberal newspaper and is in love with the boss' lovely, talented computer scientist daughter, Kesso. But his choice meets with stiff opposition from his strict Muslim father Karamako, who is the guardian of the ancestral tradition of their village as well as imam of Conakry. Karamako's dream inspired insistence that BB go to Saudi Arabia to study to become an imam, against the young man's wishes, further complicates the relationship, especially when Kesso becomes pregnant with BB's child.

Awards 
 Ouidah (Benín) 2008
 Verona 2007
 Tübingen-Stuttgart 2007
 Songes d'une nuit DV 2007
 FESPACO 2007

References 

 

2007 films
French drama films
Guinean drama films
2000s French films